This is a list of the larger offshore islands of Europe.

In the Atlantic Ocean 

 Major islands and the island groups of the British Isles (Anglo-Celtic Isles) 
Great Britain
Ireland

England

Isle of Wight
Isle of Sheppey
Hayling Island
Foulness Island
Portsea Island
Canvey Island
Mersea Island
Walney Island
Wallasea Island
Lundy
Isles of Scilly

Scotland

Main archipelagoes

Shetland
Orkney
Outer Hebrides
Inner Hebrides
Islands of the Clyde
Islands of the Forth
Outlying islands
Largest islands

Lewis and Harris
Skye
Mainland, Shetland
Mull
Islay
Mainland, Orkney
Arran
Jura
South Uist
North Uist

Wales
Anglesey
Holy Island

Ireland
Achill Island
Aran Islands
Rathlin Island

Isle of Man
 Isle of Man
 Calf of Man

Channel Islands
Jersey
Guernsey 
Alderney
Sark

Major Danish islands:
 Samsø
 Sejerø
Major Swedish islands:
Orust
Hisingen
Tjörn
Other major Atlantic islands:
Azores (Portugal) - politically and culturally associated with Europe
Madeira (Portugal) - politically and culturally associated with Europe
Canary Islands (Spain) - politically and culturally associated with Europe
Faroe Islands (Denmark)
Greenland (Denmark) - geographically a part of the continent of North America, politically and culturally associated with Europe.
Iceland - traverses the border between the North American and the Eurasian continental plates, politically and culturally associated with Europe.

In the Great Belt and the Sound (Øresund/Öresund) 

Danish islands:
 Funen
 Peberholm
 Sprogø
 Zealand

In the Baltic Sea 

Major Danish islands:
 Bornholm
 Falster
 Lolland
 Major Estonian islands:
 Abruka
 Hiiumaa
 Kihnu
 Muhumaa
 Naissaar
 Osmussaar
 Piirissaar
 Ruhnu
 Saaremaa
 Vilsandi
 Vormsi
Major Swedish islands:
 Gotland
 Öland
 Värmdö
Other major Baltic islands:
 Åland (territory under Finnish sovereignty)
 Beryozovye Islands (located in the Gulf of Finland) (Russia)
 Fehmarn (Germany)
 Hailuoto (Finland)
 Rügen (Germany)
 Usedom/Uznam (Germany and Poland)
 Wolin (Poland)

In the North Sea 

 German and Dutch islands:
Frisian Islands
 Danish Wadden Sea Islands
 North Jutlandic Island

In the Mediterranean Sea 

 Western Mediterranean:
Balearic Islands (Spain)
 Islas Chafarinas (Spain; plazas de soberanía)
 Islas Alhucemas (Spain; plazas de soberanía)
Comino (Malta)
Cominotto (Malta)
Corsica (France)
Elba (Italy)
Fungus Rock (Malta)
Gozo (Malta)
Filfla (Malta)
Ischia (Italy)
Lampedusa (Italy; geographically African)
Lampione (Italy)
Linosa (Italy)
Malta (Malta)
Manoel Island (Malta)
Pantelleria (Italy)
Ponza (Italy)
Sardinia (Italy)
Sicily (Italy)
St. Paul's Islands (Malta)
Southern Mediterranean:
Crete (Greece)
Euboea (Greece)
Lesbos Island (Greece)
Rhodes (Greece)
Chios (Greece)
Cyclades (Greece)
Dodecanese (Greece)
Sporades (Greece)
Northeastern Aegean Islands (Greece and Turkey)
Argo-Saronic Islands (Greece)
Ionian Islands (Greece)
Sazan (Albania)
Sveti Nikola Island (Montenegro)
Brač (Croatia)
Cres (Croatia)
Čiovo (Croatia)
Dugi Otok (Croatia)
Hvar (Croatia)
Iž (Croatia)
Korčula (Croatia)
Krk (Croatia)
Lastovo (Croatia)
Lošinj ˙(Croatia)
Mljet (Croatia)
Molat (Croatia)
Murter (Croatia)
Pag (Croatia)
Pašman (Croatia)
Rab (Croatia)
Šolta (Croatia)
Ugljan (Croatia)
Vir (Croatia)
The rest of Greek Islands, Cyprus and Croatia are also part of Southern Mediterranean.

In the Black Sea 
Bulgarian islands are parts of Eastern Mediterranean.
St. Anastasia Island
St. Cyricus Island
St. Ivan Island
St. Thomas Island
Romanian islands
Sacalinu Mare Island
Sacalinu Mic Island
Turkish islands, between Europe And Asia
Amasra Tavşan Adası
Büyükada (Amasra)
Giresun Island
Hoynat Islet 
Kefken Island

Ukrainian islands
Snake Island

In the Arctic Ocean 

Norwegian islands:
Jan Mayen
 Svalbard (territory of Norway):
 Bear Island
 Spitzbergen
 Nordaustlandet
Russian islands:
Bolshevik Island
Franz Josef Land
Komsomolets Island
Novaya Zemlya
October Revolution Island
Pioneer Island
Schmidt Island
Severnaya Zemlya

In the Norwegian Sea 
 Norwegian islands
 Hitra
 Lofoten
 Sørøya

Islands in lakes 
Islands in Italy:
San Giulio island (Orta lake)
Isola Bella (Maggiore lake)
Isola Madre (Maggiore lake)
Isola dei Pescatori (Maggiore lake)
Islands in North Macedonia:
Golem Grad Island (Prespa Lake)

Islands in rivers 
 Kundziņsala, Daugava River, Latvia
 Tiber Island, Italy
 Islands in the River Thames, England, United Kingdom
 Margaret_Island, Budapest, Hungary

See also 
 List of European islands by area
 List of European islands by population
 List of islands in the Danube

External links

Europe
Islands